Music Box is educational software which teaches about computer-generated music. At the 1995 BETT Educational Computing & Technology Awards, the software won Gold in the primary category.

References 

Educational software